Boise County is a rural mountain county in the U.S. state of Idaho. As of the 2020 United States Census, the population was 7,610. The county seat is historic Idaho City, which is connected through a series of paved and unpaved roads to Lowman, Centerville, Placerville, Pioneerville, Star Ranch, Crouch, Garden Valley, and Horseshoe Bend.

Boise County is part of the Boise, ID Metropolitan Statistical Area.

The Bogus Basin ski area is in the southwestern part of the county. The county's eastern area contains the central section of the Sawtooth Wilderness, the western part of the Sawtooth National Recreation Area.

In 2010, the center of Idaho's population was in Boise County.

History
The county was established on February 4, 1864, with its county seat at Idaho City. It was named for the Boise River, which was named by French-Canadian explorers and trappers for the great variety of trees growing along its banks in the lower desert valley. The county is one of four Idaho counties that also existed under Washington Territory. On January 12, 1863, The Washington territorial legislature established the county containing most of Idaho below 114° 30', excluding the territory lying west of the Payette River. They established its county seat at what later became Idaho City.

The Boise Basin, which contains Idaho City, was one of the nation's richest gold mining districts; gold was discovered in 1862, and more of it was pulled from present-day Boise County than from the entire state of Alaska. At its peak in the mid-1860s, Idaho City was the largest city in the Northwest, and it was this rapid population influx that led to the establishment of the Idaho Territory in 1863. The lower–elevation communities of Horseshoe Bend (Payette River) and Boise (Boise River) were staging areas for the Boise Basin mines.

The county's boundaries changed several times during Idaho's territorial period. Owyhee County (Idaho's oldest) and a portion of Oneida County were carved from the southern and eastern portion of the county as it existed under Washington Territory in late December 1863 and January 1864. When Idaho Territory established the county in February 1864, it contained all of present Ada, Canyon, and Payette counties. It also included most of present Boise and Gem Counties, the southern half of Washington County, and small portions of Adams, Custer, Owyhee, and Valley counties.

When Ada County was created in December 1864, most of that territory was transferred to Ada County, leaving only small portions of Custer, Gem, Payette, Valley, and Washington counties together with most of present-day Boise County. The Boise River portion of the current western boundary was established by 1866. The southern boundary common to present Ada County was defined the following year. The northern boundary was most volatile Between 1873 and 1887 with the boundary shifting further north into Valley County, back south below Cascade, and then again north to include the North Fork of Payette River Basin. The county obtained its current boundary after Gem County was created in 1915 and Valley County in 1918.

In March 2011, the county filed a Chapter 9 bankruptcy petition due to judgment against the county for violating the Fair Housing Act. The county's petition for Chapter 9 relief was denied.

Geography
The highest point in the county is 

The elevated central basin area rises  higher than Horseshoe Bend for instance and thus receives significantly more snow during the winter. Snow volumes around the county are best illustrated by the county Snow Load Map. Placerville roofs must be designed to withstand 150 pounds per square foot of snow whereas Horseshoe Bend is a third of that at 52.

Adjacent counties

Valley County - north
Custer County - east
Elmore County - south
Ada County - southwest
Gem County - northwest

National protected areas
 Boise National Forest (part)
 Sawtooth National Recreation Area (part)
 Sawtooth Wilderness (part)

Major highways
 - Ponderosa Pine Scenic Byway

 - Payette River Scenic Byway

The county's two primary routes are scenic byways. Both are two-lane undivided highways for most of their length. The Ponderosa Pine Scenic Byway on State Highway 21 climbs northeast from Boise to Idaho City and Lowman, and ends at Stanley in Custer County, at the junction with State Highway 75. The Payette River Scenic Byway on State Highway 55 is a designated national scenic byway. It heads north from Eagle to Horseshoe Bend and climbs the whitewater of the Payette River to Cascade and McCall in Valley County, and ends at New Meadows in Adams County, at the junction with US Route 95.

The closest thing to a traffic signal in Boise County is a flashing red light for Highway 52 where it meets Highway 55, in Horseshoe Bend. Highway 55 has a flashing yellow.
Highway 52 & Highway 55 Horseshoe Bend

Demographics

2000 census
As of the 2000 United States Census, there were 6,670 people, 2,616 households, and 1,899 families in the county. The population density was 3.5 people per square mile (1/km2). There were 4,349 housing units at an average density of 2 per square mile (1/km2). The racial makeup of the county was 95.23% White, 0.12% Black or African American, 0.93% Native American, 0.30% Asian, 0.10% Pacific Islander, 1.30% from other races, and 2.01% from two or more races. 3.42% of the population were Hispanic or Latino of any race. 18.4% were of German, 14.8% American, 13.8% English and 9.8% Irish ancestry.

There were 2,616 households, out of which 30.70% had children under the age of 18 living with them, 62.50% were married couples living together, 5.80% had a female householder with no husband present, and 27.40% were non-families. 21.80% of all households were made up of individuals, and 6.10% had someone living alone who was 65 years of age or older. The average household size was 2.52 and the average family size was 2.93.

The county population contained 26.90% under the age of 18, 4.70% from 18 to 24, 27.10% from 25 to 44, 30.30% from 45 to 64, and 11.00% who were 65 years of age or older. The median age was 40 years. For every 100 females, there were 105.40 males. For every 100 females age 18 and over, there were 106.30 males.

The median income for a household in the county was $38,651, and the median income for a family was $43,138. Males had a median income of $35,802 versus $26,250 for females. The per capita income for the county was $18,787. About 9.00% of families and 12.90% of the population were below the poverty line, including 16.40% of those under age 18 and 7.70% of those age 65 or over.

2010 census
As of the 2010 United States Census, there were 7,028 people, 2,974 households, and 2,051 families in the county. The racial makeup of the county was 95.4% white, 0.8% American Indian, 0.4% Asian, 0.2% black or African American, 0.1% Pacific islander, 0.8% from other races, and 2.3% from two or more races. Those of Hispanic or Latino origin made up 3.5% of the population. In terms of ancestry, 26.0% were German, 17.4% were English, 10.9% were Irish, 8.6% were American, and 6.0% were Scottish.

Of the 2,974 households, 24.6% had children under the age of 18 living with them, 59.5% were married couples living together, 5.6% had a female householder with no husband present, 31.0% were non-families, and 25.3% of all households were made up of individuals. The average household size was 2.35 and the average family size was 2.80. The median age was 48.4 years.

The median income for a household in the county was $48,789 and the median income for a family was $60,042. Males had a median income of $48,676 versus $36,919 for females. The per capita income for the county was $24,288. About 8.9% of families and 16.3% of the population were below the poverty line, including 23.4% of those under age 18 and 9.6% of those age 65 or over.

Population history
 1863 - 16,835 (17,435)
 1864 - 15,158

Communities

Cities

 Crouch
 Horseshoe Bend
 Idaho City
 Placerville

Census-designated places

Banks
Garden Valley
Lowman
Robie Creek

Unincorporated communities

 Brownlee
 Centerville
 Gardena
 Grandjean
 Grimes Pass
 New Centerville
 Pioneerville
 Quartzburg
 Washington Mill

Politics
Hattie F. Noble was the first women to represent Boise, in 1898 after Idaho gave voting rights to women in 1896.

Boise County voters are reliably Republican. In only one national election since 1948 has the county selected the Democratic Party candidate.

Education
School districts include:
 Basin School District 72
 Boise City Independent School District 1
 Emmett Independent School District 221
 Garden Valley School District 71
 Horseshoe Bend School District 73

See also
 National Register of Historic Places listings in Boise County, Idaho

Notes

References

External links

 
 Boise County Parcel Maps - Boise County Parcel Maps
 State of Idaho site - Boise County profile
 Idaho Summits.com - Thompson Peak

 
Populated places established in 1864
Idaho counties
1864 establishments in Idaho Territory
Boise metropolitan area